Vithalrao Eknath Rao Vikhe Patil was an Indian industrialist, the founder of the first sugar factory in the cooperative sector in India at Loni, in Maharashtra and the founder of a group of industries and institutions composed of Institute of Business Management and Rural Development, Padmashri Dr. Vithalrao Vikhe Patil Foundation's Medical College and Hospital and Padmashri Dr. Vitthalrao Vikhe Patil Sahakari Sakhar Karkhana Limited, operating under Padmashree Dr. Vithalrao Foundation. The Government of India honoured him in 1961,with the award of Padma Shri, the fourth highest Indian civilian award for his services to the nation. His son, Balasaheb Vikhe Patil, was a recipient of Padma Bhushan, a member of parliament and a former minister.

See also
 Balasaheb Vikhe Patil
 Radhakrishna Vikhe Patil

References

Recipients of the Padma Shri in trade and industry
Date of birth missing
Date of death missing
People from Ahmednagar
People from Maharashtra
Indian industrialists
Businesspeople in the sugar industry
Indian sugar industry